Richard Pepper Arden, 1st Baron Alvanley  (20 May 1744 – 19 March 1804) was a British barrister and Whig politician, who served as the Chief Justice of the Court of Common Pleas. He was a Member of Parliament from 1783 to 1801.

Biography
He was born on 20 May 1744 in Bredbury, the son of John Arden (1709–1787), and Mary Pepper, and baptised on 20 June 1744 in Stockport. Educated at The Manchester Grammar School, he matriculated at Trinity College, Cambridge in November 1761 and received his BA in 1766. Arden was admitted to the Middle Temple in 1769, and received his MA from Trinity the same year, being made a Fellow of the college shortly after.

He took chambers in Lincoln's Inn and became a close friend of William Pitt, with whom he would maintain a political alliance throughout his career. In 1776 he was made judge on the South Wales circuit. Invested as a King's Counsel in 1780, he was Solicitor General during the ministry of Shelburne, and again for a year under Pitt the Younger. At this time he entered the House of Commons as the Whig MP for Newtown, representing the seat from 1783 to 1784. In 1784 he became MP for Aldborough, and was appointed Attorney General and Chief Justice of Chester, posts he would hold until 1788.

On 4 June 1788, he was again advanced to become Master of the Rolls, and was knighted on 18 June 1788. He was also appointed to the Privy Council that year. In 1790, he left Aldborough to become MP for Hastings until 1794, and then for Bath until 1801.

In May 1801, he was appointed Chief Justice of the Court of Common Pleas, and on 22 May 1801, was created Baron Alvanley, of Alvanley, in the County of Chester. Alvanley died on 19 March 1804 and was buried a week later in Rolls Chapel, London. His will was probated in April 1804.

Quoting from Cokayne, The Complete Peerage: "He was not a man of great oratorical powers, but possessed the qualities of intelligence, readiness and wit... It would be vain to claim any great distinction for Lord Alvanley. He was a learned lawyer and a successful politician... the few productions that remain from his pen evince refinement, taste and facility of expression."

Family

On 9 September 1784, Arden married Anne Dorothea Wilbraham-Bootle (1757-1825), daughter of Richard Wilbraham-Bootle and Mary Bootle. Their children were:
John Arden (1786–1787)
Sarah Arden (d. 1787)
William Arden, 2nd Baron Alvanley (1789–1849), died unmarried.
Marianne Arden (d. 1791)
Frances Henrietta Arden (1792–1852), married on 25 June 1831 to Sir John Warrender of Lochend, 5th Baronet, son of Sir Patrick Warrender of Lochend.
Richard Pepper Arden, 3rd Baron Alvanley (1792–1857), married Lady Arabella Vane, daughter of William Henry Vane, 1st Duke of Cleveland and Lady Catherine Margaret Powlett.
Catherine Emma Arden (1794–1875)

Notes

References

External links
 

1744 births
1804 deaths
Alumni of Trinity College, Cambridge
1
Alvanley
British MPs 1780–1784
British MPs 1784–1790
British MPs 1790–1796
British MPs 1796–1800
Chief Justices of the Common Pleas
Alvanley, Richard Arden, 1st Baron
Fellows of Trinity College, Cambridge
Masters of the Rolls
Alvanley, Richard Arden, 1st Baron
Members of Parliament for the Isle of Wight
Members of the Privy Council of Great Britain
People educated at Manchester Grammar School
People from Bredbury
Politics of Bath, Somerset
UK MPs 1801–1802
UK MPs who were granted peerages
Whig (British political party) MPs for English constituencies
Knights Bachelor
19th-century English judges